Chetwode is a village and civil parish about  southwest of Buckingham in the Aylesbury Vale district of Buckinghamshire. The parish is bounded to the southwest and southeast by a brook called The Birne, which here also forms part of the county boundary with Oxfordshire.

Manor
There is a manor at Chetwode that stayed in the same family from the time of the Domesday Book in 1086 through to the 1960s. The Domesday Book records that in 1086 Robert de Thain held the manor from Odo, Bishop of Bayeux.

Priory and parish church
In 1244 Sir Ralphe de Norwich founded an Augustinian priory at Chetwode. In 1460, owing to its poverty, the priory was dissolved and annexed to the nearby Nutley Abbey in Long Crendon. This led to the first recognition of Chetwode as a village rather than just a priory.

The Church of England parish church of Saint Mary and Saint Nicholas was once part of the Augustinian priory church. However the parish church had become ruinous in the 15th century and this building replaced it as the parish church in 1480. The stonework is a fine example of the work of the 13th century, particularly the sedilia, the east window of five lancets and the triple-lancet window on the south side, with stained glass of the 13th and 14th centuries. The 14th century north chapel later became the manor pew.

A plan of the arrangements of the church and priory cloister in the 16th-century shows the development of Priory House.

Economic history
The parish's common lands were enclosed by an Act of Parliament passed in 1812.

In 1899 the Great Central Railway opened its main line to London through the southwestern part of the parish. In about 1922 the Great Central renamed the station Finmere. British Railways closed the station in 1963 and the line in 1966.

The route of High Speed 2 follows the old Great Central line route through the parish.

See also
List of English abbeys, priories and friaries serving as parish churches

References

Sources and further reading

Civil parishes in Buckinghamshire
Villages in Buckinghamshire